David Gordon Baker (February 17, 1884 – March 25, 1958) was an associate justice and chief justice on the South Carolina Supreme Court.

He served on the Florence City Council from 1910 to 1912 and in the South Carolina Senate from 1919 to 1922. From 1923 to 1931, he was the county attorney for Florence County, South Carolina.

Baker died on March 24, 1958, and is buried in Florence, South Carolina at the Mount Hope Cemetery.

References

Chief Justices of the South Carolina Supreme Court
Justices of the South Carolina Supreme Court
1884 births
People from Florence, South Carolina
1958 deaths
Place of death missing
20th-century American judges